Lofa-3 is an electoral district for the elections to the House of Representatives of Liberia. The constituency covers Kolahun District (except the communities of Kamatahun, Popalahun and Lehun) and parts of Voinjama District (Zawordamai, Kpadehmai, Kpakamai, Tobogizizu, Lawalazu).

Elected representatives

References

Electoral districts in Liberia